Parkfield may refer to: 

Parkfield, California, an unincorporated community in California, United States
Parkfield earthquake, various earthquakes that have occurred near Parkfield
Parkfield Interventional EQ Fieldwork, land art near Parkfield
Parkfield, Cornwall, a hamlet in Cornwall, United Kingdom
Parkfield, a park and stadium serving Potters Bar Town F.C. in Potters Bar, Hertfordshire, United Kingdom
Parkfield Colliery, a former coal mine in South Gloucestershire, United Kingdom
Parkfield High School, a former secondary school in Wolverhampton, West Midlands, United Kingdom